, 144 GLONASS navigation satellites have been launched, of which 132 reached the correct orbit and 23 are currently operational.

Satellites 
GC number (Ground Control number, Russian: системный номер, номер по наземному комплексу управления) is the spacecraft number in almanac. It only has to be unique during life time of each satellite. Numbers are subject to reuse. Some catalogs mistakenly used GC numbers for historical identification. See notes next to GC numbers.

Satellites by version

Orbital slots 
GC numbers refer to currently active satellites. GC numbers in parentheses refer to non-operational satellites under testing or in reserve.Refer to Official GLONASS web page for the most up-to-date information.

Planned launches

See also 

 List of BeiDou satellites
 List of Galileo satellites
 List of GPS satellites
 List of NAVIC satellites

References

External links 
 Official GLONASS web page
 UNB GPS Constellation Status

GLONASS